Dangerous Seas is a 1931 British crime film directed by Edward Dryhurst and starring Julie Suedo, Sandy Irving and Charles Garry.

It was made as a quota quickie.

Cast
Julie Suedo as Nan Penwardine 
Sandy Irving as Captain Muddle 
Charles Garry as Penwardine 
Gerald Rawlinson as Standford 
Wallace Bosco as Sunny Bantick 
Gladys Dunham as Polly

References

Bibliography
 Chibnall, Steve. Quota Quickies: The Birth of the British 'B' Film. British Film Institute, 2007.
 Low, Rachael. Filmmaking in 1930s Britain. George Allen & Unwin, 1985.
 Wood, Linda. British Films, 1927-1939. British Film Institute, 1986.

External links

1931 films
1931 crime films
Films directed by Edward Dryhurst
British black-and-white films
British crime films
Quota quickies
Films set in Cornwall
1930s English-language films
1930s British films